Binjana railway station is a railway station on Indore–Gwalior line under the Ratlam railway division of Western Railway zone. This is situated at Binjana in Dewas district of the Indian state of Madhya Pradesh.

References

Railway stations in Dewas district
Ratlam railway division